Lieutenant-Colonel Sir Harold Arthur Deane  (1854–1908) was an administrator in British India. Deane served as the first Political Agent of the Malakand in 1895 and also as the first Chief Commissioner of the North-West Frontier Province upon the creation of the province on 9 November 1901.

Career
Deane was commissioned in 1874 and promoted to captain in 1885 and to Major in 1894. The following year he became the first Political Agent of the Malakand and in 1896 he was appointed a CSI and then promoted to Lieutenant-Colonel in 1900. In 1901 he became the Chief Commissioner of the North-West Frontier Province following its creation by Lord Curzon - a position he held until his death in 1908.

Collection
Deanne's remarkable collection of Gandharan and ancient Buddhist and Hindu artefacts, including three rare wooden panels from the Kashmir Smast, is now held by the British Museum.

References

Bibliography 
 Llewelyn Morgan, Luca Maria Oliveri, The View from Malakand: Harold Deane’s ‘Note on Udyana and Gandhara’ (Oxford, 2022)

Indian Political Service officers
Knights Commander of the Order of the Star of India
Bengal Staff Corps officers
Indian Staff Corps officers
1908 deaths
1854 births
British collectors
54th Regiment of Foot officers